KGHS may refer to:

Kaohsiung Girl's High School, a prestigious, all-girls high school located in Cianjin District, Kaohsiung City, Taiwan.
KGHS (AM)